Study or studies may refer to:

General
 Education
Higher education
 Clinical trial
 Experiment
 Observational study 
 Research
 Study skills, abilities and approaches applied to learning

Other
 Study (art), a drawing or series of drawings done in preparation for a finished piece
 Study (film), a 2012 film by Paolo Benetazzo
 Study (Flandrin), an 1835/36 painting by Hippolyte Flandrin
 Study (room), a room in a home used as an office or library
 Study (soundtrack), a soundtrack album from the 2012 film
 The Study, a private all-girls school in Westmount, Quebec, Canada
 Studies (journal), published by the Jesuits in Ireland
 Eduard Study (1862–1930), German mathematician
 Facebook Study, a market research app

See also 
 Étude, a short musical composition
 
 
 
 Studie